Mickaël Firmin (born September 21, 1990 in Rodez) is a French professional football player who most recently played for L'Entente SSG

He made his professional debut in the 2007–08 season in Ligue 1 for Toulouse FC.

External links
 

1990 births
Living people
French footballers
Ligue 1 players
Championnat National players
Toulouse FC players
SAS Épinal players
Paris FC players
US Quevilly-Rouen Métropole players
Entente SSG players
Association football midfielders